Neftekamsk is a city in the Republic of Bashkortostan, Russia, located in the northwest of the republic on the Kama River,  from the republic's capital Ufa. It is a large industrial and cultural center of the republic. Population:

Etymology
The city is named after the Kama River and petroleum (neft in Russian).

Geography
The city's territory borders Krasnokamsky and Yanaulsky Districts. A road network connects the town to Ufa, Birsk, Yanaul, Agidel, Oktyabrsky, Izhevsk, Perm, and Kazan. There is a local train connecting Neftekamsk with Yanaul via Amzya. Neftekamsk Airport serves the city.

History
It was founded in 1957 after the discovery of an oil field in Krasnokamsky District. Town status was granted to it in 1963.

Administrative and municipal status
Within the framework of administrative divisions, it is, together with seven rural localities, incorporated as the city of republic significance of Neftekamsk—an administrative unit with the status equal to that of the districts. As a municipal division, the city of republic significance of Neftekamsk is incorporated as Neftekamsk Urban Okrug.

Demographics
The city ranks fourth in population in the republic after Ufa, Sterlitamak, and Salavat.

Economy
The principal place of business of the city is the Neftekamsk Automotive Plant, which is one of the major producers of passenger buses in Russia.

References

Notes

Sources

Cities and towns in Bashkortostan
Populated places established in 1963
Populated places in Neftekamsk urban okrug